Andrea Jin is a Canadian comedian. She is most noted for her 2021 comedy album Grandma's Girl, for which she won the Juno Award for Comedy Album of the Year at the Juno Awards of 2022.

References

External links

21st-century Canadian comedians
Canadian stand-up comedians
Canadian women comedians
Canadian people of Chinese descent
Living people
Juno Award for Comedy Album of the Year winners
Year of birth missing (living people)